Dennis Lee Berkholtz (born January 19, 1945) is an American former handball player who competed in the 1972 Summer Olympics.

He was born in Appleton, Wisconsin.

In 1972 he was part of the American team which finished 14th in the Olympic tournament. He played three matches and scored six goals. He was coach of the US at the 1976 Olympics.

External links
 profile

1945 births
Living people
American male handball players
Olympic handball players of the United States
Handball players at the 1972 Summer Olympics
Sportspeople from Appleton, Wisconsin
Sportspeople from Wisconsin